Aaahh!!! Real Monsters is an American animated television series developed by Klasky Csupo for Nickelodeon. The show focuses on three young monsters—Ickis, Oblina, and Krumm—who attend a school for monsters under a city dump and learn to frighten humans. Many of the episodes revolve around them making it to the surface in order to perform "scares" as class assignments.

The series premiered on October 29, 1994, on Nickelodeon. Running a total of 52 episodes over 4 seasons, the final episode aired December 6, 1997.

Plot
The episodes follow the adventures of Ickis, Oblina, and Krumm, three young monster friends attending a monster school whose headmaster is The Gromble.

The show is set in New York City, demonstrated throughout the series by the presences of the Empire State Building and the IND Subway System, and in the episode "Monster Make-Over" when Ickis refers to himself as "the ugliest, slimiest, razor fanged, sharp clawed, monster menace this side of Newark!" The dump the monsters inhabit is implied to be Fresh Kills Landfill, but never explicitly named in the series. The monster community includes a working economic system using toenails as currency.

Episodes

Characters

Main
  (voiced by Charlie Adler) is a small purple-pink monster who is often mistaken for a rabbit due to his large ears. He is the son of Slickis, a famous scarer. He seems the most skittish of the monsters but is also a capable leader. Ickis looms and grows in size to scare, and comes from a long line of loomers. Ickis's constant goofing off and blatant disregard for rules are usually the focal point and source of his group's troubles in most episodes. Another running gag in the series is that Ickis nearly exposes the Monster World to humans accidentally, which spells certain doom for monsterkind. His voice actor, Charlie Adler, has voiced other characters prior, such as with Buster Bunny in Tiny Toon Adventures, which may explain why he's mistaken for a rabbit, as well as Ed and Bev Bighead in Rocko's Modern Life. As an inside joke, Ickis sometimes says Ed's catchphrase "I hate my life."
  (voiced by Christine Cavanaugh) is a black and white striped monster shaped like an upside-down candy cane who comes from a wealthy monster family, and is considered by The Gromble to be his best student. She is the daughter of an overbearing mother named Sublima whom she refers to as "mumsy dearest". One of her favorite methods of scaring humans is reaching within herself and pulling out her internal organs, and she has considerable talent for shapeshifting into various terrifying forms. She also has a talent for inducing nightmares in humans by sticking her finger in their ears and tickling their brains while they sleep. She also has big red lips and temporarily lost them to a coy young human girl who wanted to be a model. When voicing Oblina, Christine Cavanaugh attempted to make the voice sound like a British version of the actress Agnes Moorehead. Cavanaugh had also voiced Chuckie Finster in Rugrats.
 Krumm (voiced by David Eccles) is an orange-tan hairy monster whose eyeballs are not attached to his body, and are usually carried in his hands, if he requires the use of both hands, he can carry them in his mouth. When he sleeps, he keeps his eyes in a glass of water next to his bed. His most valuable tool in scaring is his overwhelming armpit stench, as well as using his eyeballs. A running gag in the series is that Krumm sometimes loses his eyeballs and has to get them back, once going so far as to make a fake head to keep from losing them. Krumm was Eccles' only most notable voice acting role, and hasn't done much since 2007. Prior to voicing Krumm, Eccles had also voiced the monster under Chuckie's bed in an episode of Rugrats.
 The Gromble (voiced by Gregg Berger) is a green-blue monster with two tufts of hair, a beard, and a tail. He wears a belt around his waist and a red pump on each of his four feet. He is known for his quick temper, harsh punishments and keen awareness of the misbehavior of his students, especially with Ickis, the one student he clashes with the most. He speaks with a seemingly calm, falsetto voice until whomever he is speaking with feels safe only to yell at the top of his lungs when angered. While serving as the leader and principal of the dump, The Gromble teaches young monsters and evaluates them using the Viewfinder, a chair like projection device used to replay the scaring activities of students. Along with Ickis, he is one of the few monsters who can hear the Pool of Elders—the source of monster existence that is made of the very substance of fears. He was heavily influenced by the Chief Blue Meanie in Yellow Submarine. At the time of voicing the Gromble, Gregg Berger had also voiced Cornfed the Pig on Duckman, another Klasky Csupo show that premiered in 1994.
 The Snorch (voiced by David Eccles) is the disciplinarian of the Monster Academy who works for The Gromble and is often seen with Zimbo. Though he mostly does not speak and only makes vocal effects, he once wore a voicebox translator whose voice was provided by Brock Peters. He operates three chambers labeled "Something Bad" (a hissing boiler-like room), "Something Really Bad" (a mechanical cyclops with sharp teeth) and "You don't want to know" (a cheerful pink house with colorful flora). His main form of torture, aside from the chambers, is to sing opera, which he is quite bad at (hence the punishment).
 Zimbo (voiced by Tim Curry) is a monster who resembles a bee with one mammal-like leg and a humanoid face with green hair. He is The Gromble's assistant in his class and is always seen on the head of The Snorch. Zimbo appears to be petty and jealous of anyone becoming friends with The Snorch, although he too has been punished by him for misbehavior.
 Simon (voiced by Jim Belushi) is the main and recurring antagonist of the series, a human who wears a jacket and glasses, and is determined to prove that monsters exist and wants to exterminate them. Before becoming a monster hunter, he tried to capture Bigfoot and built a giant robot. Simon once had to save Ickis from three other hunters who attempted to take sole credit for exposing monsters to the human world, though he warned Ickis that he would go right back to trying to expose them. Belushi ad-libbed much of Simon's dialogue.
 Bradley (voiced by Brett Alexander) is a human friend of the monsters. He first appears in the second episode where he encounters Ickis and befriends him, appearing again in an episode with Simon the Monster Hunter. He goes on TV with Simon and two other monster victims and everybody laughs at him, not believing that monsters exist. Later, Bradley frees Ickis and the rest of the monsters when Ickis gains his sympathy, undermining Simon and protecting the secret that monsters are real. In a later episode, Bradley is worried about being picked on while camping in the woods until he agrees to help Ickis with a scare. After this, he becomes very popular with his peers.

Recurring
 Slickis (voiced by Billy Vera) is Ickis's father and one of The Gromble's favorite former students. This causes Ickis to have a rough relationship with his father Slickis in one episode.
 Horvak (voiced by David Eccles) is Krumm's father. He lost one of his eyes at the Battle of Concord and wears a black glove over that respective hand, similar to wearing an eyepatch. He was considered to be one of The Gromble's worst students and now works as a mold farmer because he lost his stench as a kid.
 Sal (voiced by Peter Bonerz) is a parasite who makes monsters hungry.
 Mama Gromble (voiced by Andrea Martin) is the Gromble's mother.
 Sublima (voiced by Charlie Adler) is Oblina's mother. Sublima comes from a rich family and strongly disapproves of Oblina scaring. She almost made her daughter quit school and come back home. Sublima even made fun of mold farmers (such as Horvak).
 Skeetch (voiced by Marvin Kaplan) is Oblina's father. Unlike her mother, Skeetch loves the fact that Oblina wants to be a scarer and supports her all the way. Skeetch refers to Oblina as "Stripes". Eventually, Skeetch gets rid of his and Sublima's toenail fortune.
 Nicky (voiced by Steven Hartman) is one of the monster's human friends. He is a 10-year-old boy who befriended Ickis.
 The Shroink (voiced by Michael Prince) is an elderly monster who was The Gromble's mentor when he was younger.
 Dizzle (voiced by Cynthia Mann) is a female monster student who likes Ickis.
 Dr. Buzz Kutt (voiced by Edward Winter) is a monster who is the residential doctor.
 Doc (voiced by Charlie Adler) is the monster doctor.
 Borl (voiced by Michael Dorn)
 Kriggle (voiced by Dorian Harewood)
 Exposia Vertov (voiced by Lisa Raggio)
 Snav (voiced by Xander Berkeley)
 Zooeuh (voiced by Kevin Michael Richardson)
 Phuepal (voiced by Victor Wilson)
 Marty (voiced by Thomas F. Wilson)
 Deitrich Duchamp (voiced by Bronson Pinchot) is a mincing fashion designer with an over-the-top fake French accent. His real name is Leonard and he is from Duluth, but the only one he has admitted this to is The Gromble in "Amulet of Enfarg". He reappears in "The Lips Have It" when he turns down a hopeful would-be model named Lucy until Oblina's lips accidentally land on her face and he takes Oblina's ranting as Lucy behaving like a typical spoiled supermodel with attitude.
 Don is a human traumatized by the monsters. He was perfectly normal until Oblina frightened him. His catchphrase is, "I really like rice." He also appeared on a talk show with Simon and two other characters. This character was scrapped after season 1.
 Murray the Monster – Murray is a human dressed as a monster who once had his own TV show. When Ickis, Oblina and Krumm saw him they thought he was a real monster betraying them. Tired of making them a laughing stock, Oblina caused him to have a nightmare. She, Krumm and Ickis threatened him but he woke up. Then they scared him for real during a stage show. Murray then retired and started working at a toy store. He also appeared on a talk show in another episode with Simon the monster hunter and two other characters and everyone laughed at him. This character was scrapped after season 1.
 Chomble (voiced by Carlos Alazraqui)

Production
Aaahh!!! Real Monsters was created by Gábor Csupó and Peter Gaffney, and was the third animated series produced by Csupó's company Klasky Csupo, which also created the animated shows Rugrats and Duckman on USA Network. Before the final title was chosen, which took over 5 years, the series had the working titles Monsters and Real Monsters. The show was conceived after Csupó and his wife and creative partner Arlene Klasky were approached by the network Nickelodeon to create a follow-up series to Rugrats. Csupó was inspired to write a show about monsters because his own young children loved them. He also said he knew Nickelodeon would not want a series about human characters because everybody else was pitching shows about animals. Csupó drew some sketches of possible monsters on a piece of paper and successfully pitched the idea to the network: "I wanted them silly and not too skillful – and the idea worked."

Nickelodeon programming director Herb Scannell said the character design in Aaahh!!! Real Monsters was partially inspired by Yellow Submarine, a 1968 animated film that was, in turn, inspired by The Beatles. The character Gromble, in particular, bears a close resemblance to the Blue Meanie characters from that film. Director of the series Igor Kovalyov said the style was inspired by his earlier Soviet film Investigation Held by Kolobki which he and Gábor Csupó showed to the producers who then gave Kovalyov's team a lot of creative freedom with the art direction and storyboarding. Csupó said some elements of the show have a look similar to the film noir genre, and called the city dump where the monster characters reside reminiscent of the visual style from the films Blade Runner (1982) and Brazil (1985). The characters guest-starred in the 1999 Rugrats episode "Ghost Story". Before that, David Eccles, the voice of Krumm, provided the monster voice coming from under Chuckie's bed.

Reception

Reviews
Reviews for Aaahh!!! Real Monsters were very positive. Josef Adalian of The Washington Times praised the show's animation and sense of humor, although it was not as "hip and witty" as The Ren & Stimpy Show or The Simpsons. Although he felt the show would appeal to children over nine as well as adults, he said it may not appeal to those who "react negatively to semi-scary sights and gags about body odor, physical punishment or abusive older siblings". USA Today writer Matt Roush called it "garish and blissfully silly" and praised the show's "outrageous characters have just enough Ren & Stimpy grodiness, but tempered with exceptional sweetness". Ginny Holbert of the Chicago Sun-Times called it a "cute and clever" series with "wit and inventive creatures", and compared the animation to the work of artist Peter Max. Gannett News Service writer Mike Hughes called it a "terrific cartoon series", and said the show's "wildly perverse humor" had a "distinctly European style" that reflected Gábor Csupó's Hungarian background.

The Plain Dealer writer Tom Feran called the show "good fun" and favorably compared the series' premise to that of the animated film The Nightmare Before Christmas. Boston Herald writer Frances Katz wrote, "If there was ever a great title for a cartoon, it has to be Nickelodeon's Aaahh!!! Real Monsters'''." Not all reviews were positive. The November 1994 issue of Parenting magazine listed Aaahh!!! Real Monsters as #1 in its top ten list of the worst new shows of the television season, describing it as "Graphic and scatological; it's just plain gross." Some media outlets pointed out similarities between Aaahh!!! Real Monsters and The Brothers Grunt, an MTV animated television series created by Danny Antonucci about a group of grotesque humanoid characters. Gábor Csupó rejected these comparisons and claims his show was more story- and character-driven with a different visual style, while Antonucci's show was idea-driven. Csupó did not want Aaahh!!! Real Monsters to be lumped together with The Brothers Grunt, especially since that show received low ratings and negative reviews, lasting for 8 months, and that Danny Antonucci called it "MTV's dirty little secret".

Awards
The pilot episode of Aaahh!!! Real Monsters won first prize for film animation producer for television at both the Houston Film Festival and Ottawa Film Festival. The series was nominated for a Daytime Emmy Award for Outstanding Achievement in Animation in 1995 alongside Rugrats, Animaniacs, Where on Earth Is Carmen Sandiego? and 2 Stupid Dogs. The award ultimately went to Rugrats.

Merchandising
Mattel produced a series of Aaahh!!! Real Monsters action figures in 1995. They each stand approximately 4 inches (10 cm) tall and include an action feature. Other products based on the cartoon include Fleer trading cards, books, plush toys, pens, hats, backpacks, notepads, cups, gum, and videos. At one point, General Mills also included small promotional flip books of Ickis, Krumm, Oblina, and The Gromble in its Cinnamon Toast Crunch breakfast cereal.

Home media releases
In 1995, selected episodes of Aaahh!!! Real Monsters were released on VHS by Sony Wonder. Paramount Home Video re-released the tapes in 1997. The complete first and second seasons were released for PlayStation Network for viewing on the PlayStation 3 and PSP (PlayStation Portable) systems.

Nickelodeon and Amazon.com teamed up to release Aaahh!!! Real Monsters and other Nick shows on manufactured-on-demand DVD-R discs available exclusively through Amazon.com's CreateSpace arm.Aaahh!!! Real Monsters sets, among others, were discontinued when Nick began releasing traditional DVDs of many of their series in association with Shout! Factory.

On March 22, 2011, it was announced that Shout! Factory had acquired the home video rights to the series from Nickelodeon. They have subsequently released the first three seasons on DVD. The fourth and final season was released on June 10, 2014, as a Shout! Select title.

On October 8, 2013, Shout! Factory released the complete series set in Region 1.

♦ – Shout! Factory select title, sold exclusively through Shout's online store.

In the United Kingdom, 4 volumes are available as exclusive releases in Poundland stores. Volume 1 contains the first 9 episodes (5 half-hours) from Season 1. Volume 2 contains the first 8 episodes (4 half-hours) from Season 2, while the remaining 2 volumes make up the first 16 episodes from Season 3.

Video games

A video game based on the TV series was released for the Super NES and Sega Mega Drive/Genesis developed by Realtime Associates and published by Viacom New Media in 1995. Ickis also appeared in Nicktoons Racing for the PlayStation, PC, and Game Boy Advance yet was missing from the Game Boy Color version. Oblina also has a cameo in all the versions of Nicktoons Racing, except the Game Boy Color version.

The characters were also created in full 3D for Microsoft's Nickelodeon 3D Movie Maker.

Krumm appears as a Master Model in the Wii, PlayStation 2, and Game Boy Advance versions of Nicktoons: Attack of the Toybots, while The Gromble was a Master Model in the Nintendo DS version.

Oblina and Krumm make a cameo appearance in the video game Nicktoons MLB.

Oblina is a playable character in the 2021 fighting video game Nickelodeon All-Star Brawl and the 2022 kart racing game Nickelodeon Kart Racers 3: Slime Speedway, voiced by Alex Cazares.

Appearances in popular culture

In 1998, as part of the release of The Rugrats Movie, National Amusements released an animated policy trailer featuring characters from the series.

Ickis, Oblina, and Krumm have all made their final major appearance in the Rugrats episode "Ghost Story", becoming the first time a Nicktoon crossover would be produced.

They also appeared in the Robot Chicken episode "Ants on a Hamburger", where the cast of Aaahh!!! Real Monsters have a meeting about the best ways to scare people with the scary little girl from The Ring. Also, in another Robot Chicken episode "Blackout Window Heatstroke", Ickis gets rejected from Monsters University.

Ickis' ear and mouth appear as cameos in Chip 'n Dale: Rescue Rangers.

In November 2022, Krumm appears in an advertisement for Paramount+ featuring Keegan-Michael Key as Mr. Garvey from Key & Peele.

Krumm also appears in Cartoon Network's Mad'' in the segment "How I Met Your Mummy", where he is seen at the restaurant.

References

External links

 
 
  Archived from the original on March 13, 2012.

 
1994 American television series debuts
1997 American television series endings
1990s American animated television series
1990s American horror comedy television series
1990s Nickelodeon original programming
American children's animated comedy television series
American children's animated horror television series
English-language television shows
Nicktoons
Television series by Klasky Csupo
Animated television series about monsters
Television shows set in New York City
Television shows adapted into video games
Cross-dressing in television
Television series created by Gábor Csupó
Television series created by Peter Gaffney